is a 2013 life-simulation video game for the Nintendo 3DS directed by Yasuhiro Wada, produced by Toybox Inc. and distributed by Natsume for North America, Rising Star Games for Europe, and Spike Chunsoft for Japan. It was released for iOS on June 10, 2014 under the name Hometown Story Pocket.

Gameplay
The main character is in charge of running a shop inherited from their deceased grandmother. The player is capable of arranging and stocking the shelves of their shop to their preference and can eventually expand on the size of the shop. In a similar vein to the Harvest Moon series the player is able to interact and befriend various townspeople. The town that the player resides in will consist of ten people at first and eventually build its way to one hundred non-player characters that the player can meet depending on their actions over the course of the story.

Development
The game went under the codename of "Project Happiness" and was described as being a game to spread happiness. Wada stated that the game would take place within the Harvest Moon universe, but would be an overall different experience. The game was released for the Nintendo 3DS in 2013, and was supposed to be released for iOS on the same year, but it was delayed to June 10, 2014. However, the iOS version does not include the entire content of the game, because Wada wanted it to be a more compact experience. The 3DS version was released on October 22, 2013 in North America. Rising Star Games published the same handheld version in Europe May 2014, as the creator Yasuhiro Wada confirmed during Gamescom.

It was featured at E3 2013.

Reception

The 3DS version received "generally unfavorable reviews" according to the review aggregation website Metacritic. IGN praised the graphics and soundtrack, but noted that the unclear conditions to unlock cutscenes are frustrating, as well as the controls. In Japan, however, Famitsu gave it a score of one eight, two sevens, and one eight for a total of 30 out of 40.

References

External links
Official website (Japan)
Official website (North America)
Official website (Europe)

2013 video games
IOS games
Life simulation games
Natsume (company) games
Nintendo 3DS games
Nintendo 3DS eShop games
Video games scored by Nobuo Uematsu
Video games developed in Japan
Video games featuring protagonists of selectable gender
Story of Seasons spin-off games
Rising Star Games games
Single-player video games